Danzón (Dance On) is an album by Arturo Sandoval, released through GRP Records in 1994. In 1995, the award won Sandoval the Grammy Award for Best Latin Jazz Performance and the Billboard Latin Music Award for Latin Jazz Album of the Year.

References

1994 albums
Arturo Sandoval albums
GRP Records albums
Grammy Award for Best Latin Jazz Album